Paul Ernest Rekers (November 22, 1908 – June 10, 1987) was an American long-distance runner. He competed in the men's 5000 metres at the 1932 Summer Olympics.

References

1908 births
1987 deaths
Athletes (track and field) at the 1932 Summer Olympics
American male long-distance runners
Olympic track and field athletes of the United States
Place of birth missing
20th-century American people